Mulavukad, also known locally as Bolgatty Island, is one of the islands that forms part of the city of Kochi in Kerala, India. It is situated in the Mulavukad Grama Panchayat. Vypin island and Vallarpadam island lie on its west side and Vaduthala lie to its east. Mulavukad is connected to mainland Ernakulam & Vallarpadam by the Goshree bridges and to Container terminal road at north side to connect to Kalamassery and Aluva side. Easy connection to the CBD, Northern and Southern side of Cochin city make the Island unique among other Goshree Islands. 

The Bolgatty Palace is located at the southern tip of the island. It was built by the Dutch as a centre for colonial administration, and later taken over by the British. The Palace is a popular tourist attraction and a heritage hotel, managed by the Kerala State Tourism Department (KTDC). The Lulu International Convention Center and Hyatt Hotels group is launching in Mulavukad in 2016. 
 
The island has a golf course and an international marina. The marina was the first of its kind in India and was set up by KITCO, for KTDC. Island is famous for its resorts, farm houses, water sports, safe bicycle routes, jogging tracks and multi cuisine restaurants.

Attraction of the Mulavukad is the cosmopolitan culture. People of all religion and political beliefs live in harmony and always united together for any common issues. Recently it is booming as a residential hub for Advocates from Kerala High Court and Doctors from Aster Medcity.  A service road is sanctioned along the west side of the Island in parallel to the container road.

Demographics
At the 2001 India census, Mulavukad had a population of 22,845. Males constituted 49% of the population and females 51%. Mulavukad had an average literacy rate of 86%, higher than the national average of 59.5%: male literacy was 87% and female literacy was 84%. 11% of the population were under 6 years of age.

References

External links

Neighbourhoods in Kochi
Tourist attractions in Kochi